Triantafyllos Macheridis (born 10 November 1973) is a Greek former professional footballer who played as a defensive midfielder.

Career
Macheridis began his professional career in 1990 with boyhood club Pandramaikos. After two spells with Pandramaikos and Skoda Xanthi, Triantafyllos signed for Greek football giants AEK Athens in 1996. His stay with the Athens side would prove to be successful, as on his first appearance his side won the Greek Super Cup defeating Panathinaikos on penalties. He was also an integral part of the AEK side who won the 1996–97 Greek Football Cup. After two successful seasons with AEK, Macheridis moved to Thessaloniki, to play for PAOK

On 30 December 1999 at the age of 26, Macheridis was signed by Benfica of Portugal who was at the time led by German coach Jupp Heynckes. Machairidis debuted for the Encarnados on 9 January 2000 in the Derby de Lisboa match against Sporting CP. Despite his stay with Benfica being short, Machairidis would feature regularly in a side who finished third in the domestic league campaign behind Porto and Sporting CP. He would finish the 1999–2000 season with sixteen appearances to his name.

In the transfer season of 2000, Macheridis failed to report to the preseason, with threats of having to compensate Benfica for unilaterally terminating his contract. After negotiations, he joined Kalamata on loan for the remainder of the season, leaving permanently in June 2001. Following Benfica, Triantafyllos would sign for Alki Larnaca of Cyprus where he would remain their for two seasons before finishing his career with boyhood club Doxa Drama in 2004.

Honours
AEK Athens
 Greek Super Cup: 1996
 Greek Football Cup: 1996–97

Alki Larnaca
 Cypriot Second Division: 2000–01

References

External links
 

1973 births
Living people
Footballers from Drama, Greece
Greek footballers
Pandramaikos F.C. players
Xanthi F.C. players
AEK Athens F.C. players
PAOK FC players
S.L. Benfica footballers
Kalamata F.C. players
Alki Larnaca FC players
Doxa Drama F.C. players
AO Chania F.C. players
Super League Greece players
Cypriot First Division players
Cypriot Second Division players
Primeira Liga players
Association football midfielders
Greek expatriate footballers
Expatriate footballers in Portugal
Greek expatriate sportspeople in Portugal
Expatriate footballers in Cyprus
Greek expatriate sportspeople in Cyprus